American entertainer Madonna has written eleven coffee table books, eleven articles in different publications and contributed a piece in a biography. She has also ventured into children's literature, writing seven picture books and twelve chapter books. Three of her books have topped The New York Times Best Seller list.

Her first release as an author was the coffee table book Sex (1992), published under her company Maverick. It consisted of sexually provocative and explicit images, photographed by Steven Meisel. The book received negative reaction from the media and the general public, but sold 1.5 million copies at $50 each in a matter of days. Madonna continued releasing coffee table photography books, including those associated with her concert tours like Madonna: The Girlie Show (1995), Madonna Confessions (2006) and Madonna: Sticky & Sweet (2009). She also wrote forewords for a number of books, including Alan Parker's coffee table book about the making of the film Evita (1996) and wrote a chapter for The Emperor's New Clothes: An All-Star Retelling of the Classic Fairy Tale (1998). Madonna has also written columns for publications like Harper's Bazaar, the inaugural issue of George magazine and the Israeli newspaper Yedioth Ahronoth.

In 2003, Madonna signed a contract with Callaway Arts & Entertainment. The first release was the children's book, The English Roses, which was translated into 42 different languages over 100 countries. The book debuted at number one on The New York Times Best Seller list, spending a total of 18 weeks there. Telling the story of five friends, The English Roses was deemed by critics as a reflection of Madonna's childhood, and received mixed reaction. Her second children's book, Mr. Peabody's Apples, was released in the same year and also debuted at number one on The New York Times Best Seller list. She continued releasing other books like Yakov and the Seven Thieves, The Adventures of Abdi and Lotsa de Casha; all five books released were included as part of an audiobook in 2006. As of 2007, her first six children's books sold over three million copies worldwide.

Madonna's interest in Kabbalah inspired her to venture into the children's book market. Her Kabbalah teacher had suggested her to share her spiritual knowledge in the form of written stories. All the books included the lessons Madonna had learned in Kabbalah, teaching about strong morality and warning against greed and envy. A sequel for The English Roses was released in 2006, titled The English Roses: Too Good to be True. Madonna also released a total of twelve chapter books for the series in 2007. Her success as a children's author was noted by Ed Pilkington from The Guardian, who believed that Madonna "lured a host of other celebrities and publishers into the [children's book] market".

Coffee table books

Children's books

Picture books

Chapter books 
Chapter books in The English Roses collection. All illustration by Jeffrey Fulvimari.

Articles

Biography

See also 
List of literary works by number of translations

Notes

References

Citations

Book sources

External links 
 

Bibliographies of American writers
Music bibliographies
Madonna
 
Children's literature bibliographies
Bibliography